The Department of International Relations at Sakarya University, located at the Esentepe campus, Serdivan, Sakarya, provides undergraduate and graduate education about international politics. As a department within Faculty of Political Sciences, it has an integrated curriculum with other departments of this faculty such as public administration, and economics. Established in 1997, the department of international relations has more than 4.000 alumni including business leaders, journalists, diplomats, district governors, and academics. The department has 14 full-time faculty and 11 research assistants.

History 
The Department of International Relations established in 1996 under the Faculty of Economics and Administrative Sciences. It admitted its first students during the academic year of 1997-1998. In 2007, the department inaugurated its PhD program. At the same year, the department started to send its students to Europe and receive students from European universities as part of Erasmus Programme. The Department of International Relations has continued to evolve, adding online graduate programs such as International Relations and European Union and Middle Eastern Studies in 2012. When the Faculty of Political Science was established in 2015, the department moved to this new faculty.

Academics
The Department of International Relations offers a standard graduate program with an option of a %30 English-language courses. Students can choose English-language equivalence of basic courses. The department also provides evening undergraduate education with same curriculum. In addition to graduate programs, the department offers MA, PhD and online graduate programs.

Former Heads of Department

Alaeddin Yalçınkaya, 1996-2000

İsmail Özbay

İbrahim Kamil, 2003-2003

Hasan Gürak, 2003-2004

Burhanettin Duran, 2004-2009

Alaeddin Yalçınkaya, 2009-2011

Ertan Efegil, 2011-2014

Ali Balcı, 2014-2014

Kemal Inat, 2014-2016

Ali Balcı, 2016-2018

Nesrin Kenar, 2018-2020

Kemal Inat, 2020-

Notable alumni
Mirwais Hotak, Head of Law and Regulation Department at Ministry of Commerce and Industry of Afghanistan

References

Sakarya University
Educational institutions established in 1996
Schools of international relations
1996 establishments in Turkey